Khalil Mohamed Shahin (2 March 1942 – 6 May 2017) was an Egyptian footballer. He competed in the men's tournament at the 1964 Summer Olympics.

References

External links
 
 

1942 births
2017 deaths
Egyptian footballers
Egypt international footballers
Olympic footballers of Egypt
Footballers at the 1964 Summer Olympics
Association football midfielders
Al Masry SC players
Egyptian football managers